"Say It Isn't So" is a popular torch song by Irving Berlin, published in 1932.  The song was written when Berlin was suffering a loss of confidence following several setbacks, and he initially placed the song in a drawer, feeling that it would not be successful. However, one of Berlin's employees, Max Winslow, heard it, and on his own initiative, took it to Rudy Vallée, who was then a major star on radio. Vallee sang it on his radio show and it became an immediate hit.
 
George Olsen and His Orchestra released a version in 1932 that reached No. 1, and other popular versions in 1932 were by Ozzie Nelson, Connee Boswell and Vallée. Alfredo Antonini and his orchestra collaborated with Victoria Cordova and John Serry Sr. to record the work for Muzak in the 1940s.

Cover versions
The song has been recorded many times by different artists. Notable versions include:
 Connee Boswell (1932, No. 10)
 Bing Crosby recorded the song for his album Bing Crosby's Treasury - The Songs I Love (1968 version).
 Layton & Johnstone - Columbia DB982 (1932)
 Bob and Alf Pearson - Imperial 2816 (1933)
 Johnny Maestro - Released as a solo single while he was lead singer of The Crests (1960)
 Aretha Franklin for her album Laughing on the Outside (1962)
 Billie Holiday - Lady Sings the Blues (2010 box set)
 Harry James - One Night Stand With Harry James on Tour in '64 (Joyce LP 1074, 1979)
 Stacey Kent - The Boy Next Door (2003)
 Stan Kenton - The Romantic Approach (1961)
 Teddi King -  A 1957 recording for a RCA-Victor, and'Round Midnight (2008)
 Julie London on her 1955 LP album, Julie Is Her Name.
 Lucy Maunder for her album, Songs in the Key of Black (2012).
 Ozzie Nelson and His Orchestra (1932, #8)
 Dinah Washington for her album In the Land of Hi-Fi (1956).
 Andy Williams for his album, Lonely Street (1959).
 The Caretaker, sampling the song for a track of his last release Everywhere at the End of Time (20162019).

References

1932 songs
Songs written by Irving Berlin